Carabus solieri  is a species of beetles of the family Carabidae.

Description
The body is quite slender, metallic bright  green, golden-green or green-coppery. Elytra are broad and robust, violet-red bordered and longitudinal crossed by ribs. This species mainly feeds on snails and it is crepuscular and nocturnal.

Distribution
This species occurs in France and in Italy, especially in part of the Western Alps and in Apennines.

Subspecies
 Carabus solieri bonadonai Colas, 1948
 Carabus solieri bonnetianus Colas, 1936
 Carabus solieri clairi Géhin, 1885
 Carabus solieri liguranus Breuning, 1933
 Carabus solieri solieri Dejean, 1826

References
 Biolib
 Fauna Europaea
 G.  Allegro  I Carabus del Monferrato e delle Langhe (Piemonte, Italia) (Coleoptera Carabidae
 P. Brandmayr - Natural history and applied ecology of carabid beetle
 Alessandro Minelli - La fauna in Italia

solieri
Beetles described in 1826